Ross Barbour (born 1 February 1993) is a Scottish semi-professional footballer who plays for Troon in the .

Playing career

Kilmarnock
A member of Kilmarnock's under 19 squad, Barbour was promoted to the first team on 17 December 2011, where he was an unused substitute in their match against Dundee United. He went on to make his debut aged 19, on 7 April 2012 as a second-half substitute in a 6–0 defeat to champions Celtic. On 22 May 2014, Barbour signed a new two-year contract with the club.

Kirkintilloch Rob Roy
On 25 March 2016, Barbour signed for Junior club Kirkintilloch Rob Roy on a short-term contract after he was released by Kilmarnock.

Stranraer
Barbour signed for Stranraer in July 2016. After only one month at Stranraer, Barbour left the club, citing differences with Manager Brian Reid.

Troon
Barbour signed for Troon on 24 August 2016. after leaving Stranraer.

Linlithgow Rose
Upon the expiry of his contract at Troon, Barbour joined East of Scotland side Linlithgow Rose in July 2018, where he revelled in a previously unfamiliar midfield role. After the departure of Manager Mark Bradley, Barbour requested a move back to his native West Coast.

Troon return
On 24 October 2019. Barbour re-signed for Troon.

Career statistics

References

1993 births
Living people
Footballers from Glasgow
Scottish footballers
Association football defenders
Kilmarnock F.C. players
Scottish Premier League players
Scottish Professional Football League players
Kirkintilloch Rob Roy F.C. players
Stranraer F.C. players
Troon F.C. players
Linlithgow Rose F.C. players
Scottish Junior Football Association players